OTB Sports (formerly known as Off the Ball) is an Irish media company, comprising a podcast network, website, daily radio show on nationwide broadcaster Newstalk 106-108fm and web-based live digital broadcast. It is on air seven days a week.

Primarily a sports news review, opinion and analysis show, it has also produced video documentaries on sporting topics.

Format

OTB Sports broadcasts a three-hour long sports review and analysis show from 7pm on Monday to Thursday on Newstalk, nationwide across Ireland and online. The show is also live from 7pm on Friday for two hours, and from 1pm on Saturday and Sunday for five hours.

OTB AM, which launched in October 2017, is a digital sports news review and discussion show. It is available on various platforms including YouTube, Facebook and on the OTB Sports app.

It is presented Monday to Thursday by Ger Gilroy and Eoin Sheahan, and on Friday by Sheahan and Adrian Barry. Regulars include Alan Quinlan, Ronan O'Gara, Daniel Harris, Graham Hunter, Anthony Moyles, Andy Mitten, Kieran Donaghy, Tommy Walsh and more.

Features
Regular slots on the radio show include:
Monday Night Rugby 
Wednesday Night Rugby
Friday Night Racing 
Football with John Giles
The Football Show
The Crappy Quiz
The Saturday Panel
The Sunday Papers

Hosts

Joe Molloy
Ger Gilroy
Adrian Barry
Dave McIntyre
Nathan Murphy
Eoin Sheahan
John Duggan
Kevin Kilbane
Brian O'Driscoll

Regular guest hosts on the show include former Ireland football international and manager John Giles, swimmer Ellen Keane, former Ireland and Munster player Keith Wood and former middleweight World champion Andy Lee.

History
The first episode of the radio show aired in April 2002, featuring on Newstalk which had just commenced broadcasting as an independent local radio station with a franchise for Dublin.

Newstalk also offered weekend sports programming under various titles, including Sport Saturday and Sunday. These programs eventually changed their name to Off The Ball to reflect the connection with the weekday programming in 2013.

In 2004, Off The Ball became radio commentary rights holders for the Premier League in Ireland, and extended the deal in 2016 for a further three seasons.

In 2006, presenter Ger Gilroy moved to the morning breakfast show alongside Claire Byrne, with Eoin McDevitt joining Ken Early and Ciaran Murphy as the core weeknight presenting team. In March 2013, McDevitt, Early and Murphy resigned, along with producers Mark Horgan and Simon Hick, eventually joining The Irish Times under the name of Second Captains. Presenters Joe Molloy and Dave McIntyre increased their presence on weekday programming, while Adrian Barry and Colm Parkinson joined the team shortly afterwards.

The weeknight programme is the leading show on Irish radio in its time slot, with 53,000 listeners according to JNLR figures as of October 2017.

Awards
Irish Music Rights Organisation Radio Awards (formerly PPI Radio Awards)
2009: Eoin McDevitt, Sports Broadcaster (Gold)
2011: Off The Ball, Sports Programme (Gold)
2012: Eoin McDevitt, Sports Broadcaster (Gold)
2013: Ger Gilroy, Sports Broadcaster (Gold)
2014: Joe Molloy, Sports Broadcaster (Gold)
2015: Joe Molloy, Sports Broadcaster (Gold) and Off The Ball, Sports Programme (Gold)
2016: Joe Molloy, Sports Broadcaster (Gold) and Team 33, Sports Programme (Gold)
2017: Ger Gilroy, Sports Broadcaster (Gold) and Off The Ball Weekday, Sports Programme (Gold)

Other media
The first part of the on-air radio show, which consists of a look through the sporting stories of the day, was also available on terrestrial television until late 2017. The segment was originally broadcast on Setanta Sports, and continued after the station was rebranded as Eir Sport in 2016.

References 

Irish radio programs
Irish sports broadcasters
Irish YouTubers
Irish podcasters